Three kings is Czech war series that was aired in 1998. It is loosely based on story of members of resistance organization Obrana národa who were known as Three Kings. This group consisted of Josef Balabán, Václav Morávek and Josef Mašín.

Cast and characters
 Vladimír Javorský as Václav Morávek, main protagonist of the series and the youngest of three; known as a religious gunslinger, or Leon. His personal motto is: "I believe in God and in my pistols".
 Karel Heřmánek as Josef Mašín, member of the group, the only one with a family. He is later captured and tortured.
 Jan Vlasák as Josef Balabán, oldest member and leader of the group. He is later captured and executed.
 Josef Carda as Paul Holm, agent who gives information to the "Three Kings"
 Valérie Zawadská as Evelyna Sekotová, photographer who hides the group; love interest of Morávek
 Ljuba Krbová as Zdena Mašínová, wife of Josef Mašín
 Jan Hrušínský as Major, resistance member who is in touch with the "Three Kings".
 David Matásek as Fešák, resistance member who acts as Morávek's adjutant.
 Michal Dlouhý as Frajer, resistance member; signalman who helps the "Three Kings" to communicate with London.

Episodes 
List of episodes:
Depeše pro Londýn (Dispatch for London)
Nosiči vody (Water Bearers)
Přívěsek (Bangle)
Náhradní spojení (Spare contact)
Na dně (At the bottom)
Zrada (Betrayal)
Pobožný střelec (Religious Gunslinger)

References

External links 
IMDB site

Czech adventure television series
1998 Czech television series debuts
Television series about Czech resistance to Nazi occupation
Czech Television original programming
Czech war television series
Czech-language television shows
Television shows set in the Czech Republic
Television series based on actual events
Czech spy television series